WCCA-LP is a Conservative Christian formatted broadcast radio station licensed to and serving Scottsville, Virginia.  WCCA-LP is owned and operated by Calvary Baptist Church.

References

External links
 WCCA Christian Radio Online
 

2005 establishments in Virginia
CCA-LP
Radio stations established in 2005
CCA-LP
Mass media in Charlottesville, Virginia